Sugandha is a village and a gram panchayat in Polba Dadpur CD Block in Chinsurah subdivision of Hooghly district in the state of West Bengal, India.

Demographics
At the 2011 Census of India, Sugandha had a total population of 2,250 of which 1,104 (49%) were males and 1,146 (51%) were females. The population below 6 years of age was 169. The total number of literates in Sugandha was 1,828 (87.84% of the population over 6 years).

Transport
Sugandha stands at the crossing of State Highway 13 (West Bengal) (also known as Delhi Road in the area) and Chunchura-Dhaniakhali Road.

It is 4 km from Chuchura railway station.

Education
Bengal School of Technology was established in 2006 at Sugandha. It offers undergraduate and post graduate courses in pharmacy.

References	

Villages in Hooghly district